The 2007–08 Calgary Flames season was the 28th season for the Calgary Flames and 36th season for the Flames franchise in the National Hockey League (NHL).

In a surprise move, the Flames announced on June 14 that Jim Playfair would be replaced by "Iron" Mike Keenan as the team's head coach.  Playfair remains with the Flames as an associate coach.  Keenan entered the season sixth all-time in the NHL in wins.

The trend of spending too much money on defencemen begins, with Sutter overpaying for Cory Sarich in free agency and acquiring Adrian Aucoin (and his $4 million annual salary) in a trade. Owen Nolan, Anders Eriksson, and Mark Smith. are all brought in as GM Sutter's free-agent reclamation projects, but these aging veterans do little and nothing for the team. Sutter is unable to come to terms with Mark Giordano, and the highly rated prospect heads to the Dynamo Moscow in Russia instead of the NHL. Sports writer Steve MacFarlane observes that "The team looks like it has no direction — and no confidence in an unpredictable coach".

At the end of the regular season, Miikka Kiprusoff's goals against average of 2.69 is his worst ever as a Flame.

In the playoffs, the team falls to the Sharks in seven games in the first round.

Team notes
On December 16, Keenan recorded his 600th career win as a head coach in a 5–3 victory over one of his former teams, the St. Louis Blues.

Al MacInnis was among four players inducted into the Hockey Hall of Fame on November 12, 2007. MacInnis spent 13 years in Calgary, and captured the Conn Smythe Trophy as playoff MVP when the Flames won the Stanley Cup in 1989.

On November 29, captain Jarome Iginla played in his 804th game, setting a new franchise record for games played in a Flames uniform, surpassing Al MacInnis' mark.  Two nights later, Iginla registered his 700th career point in a game against the Columbus Blue Jackets. On March 10, Iginla scored his 365th goal, surpassing Theoren Fleury's mark of 364 to become the Flames' all-time goal scoring leader.

In December, the Flames became the third team in NHL history to win all six games of a six-game road trip, a feat previously accomplished by the 1971–72 Bruins and 1982–83 Flyers.  The 2001–02 Red Wings also won six consecutive road games, though that trip was broken in half by the 2002 Winter Olympics.

Two Flames players were voted to start for the Western Conference at the 2008 All-Star Game.  Defenceman Dion Phaneuf joined Iginla for the game, which was held in Atlanta, Georgia.

On February 18, Flames' prospect Mickey Renaud, a fifth round pick in the 2007 draft, collapsed and died at the age of 19 at his home in Tecumseh, Ontario. Renaud had been playing for the Windsor Spitfires of the Ontario Hockey League, and was the team's captain.  The cause of death was not immediately known.

Regular season

Divisional standings

Conference standings

Game log

Playoffs
The Flames finished 7th in the Western Conference with 94 points, earning a first-round match-up against the Pacific Division champion San Jose Sharks. It was the third time the two teams had met in the playoffs, with the Sharks defeating the Flames in seven games in the first round of the 1995 playoffs, while the Flames defeated San Jose in six games in the 2004 Western Conference final.

After splitting the first two games in San Jose, the Flames gave up three goals to the Sharks in the first 3½ minutes of the game, but came back to win 4–3.  In doing so, the Flames became only the second team in NHL history, after the 1985 Minnesota North Stars to come back from a 3–0 deficit in the first ten minutes of a playoff game. During Game 6, in which the Flames faced elimination, they scored once in the first and second period each to shut out the Sharks 2–0, as the Sharks did during Game 2. Nolan and Langkow scored both goals respectively and Kiprusoff made 21 saves for his 6th postseason shutout.

Player statistics

Skaters
Note: GP = Games played; G = Goals; A = Assists; Pts = Points; PIM = Penalty minutes; +/- = Plus/minus

†Denotes player spent time with another team before joining Calgary. Stats reflect time with the Flames only.

Goaltenders
Note: GP = Games played; TOI = Time on ice (minutes); W = Wins; L = Losses; OT = Overtime/shootout losses; GA = Goals against; SO = Shutouts; SV% = Save percentage; GAA = Goals against average

Awards and records

Records
 7: most games to start the season with a player scoring two goals in one game.
 6: consecutive wins on a single road trip (tied for record).

Milestones

Transactions
The Flames have been involved in the following transactions during the 2007–08 season.

Trades

Free agents

Draft picks

The Flames made five selections at the 2007 NHL Entry Draft in Columbus, Ohio.  Calgary selected Swedish forward Mikael Backlund with their first selection, 24th overall.  Heading into the draft, Backlund was the second highest ranked European prospect, and 10th overall, by International Scouting Services.  Backlund joined third round selection John Negrin in making their NHL debuts with the Flames in the 2008–09 season.  The Flames tragically lost their fifth round draft pick, Mickey Renaud, when the 19-year-old captain of the Windsor Spitfires collapsed and died in his home late in the 2007–08 OHL season.  The Ontario Hockey League created a new trophy in his honour, the Mickey Renaud Captain's Trophy in 2009.

Statistics are updated to the end of the 2014–15 NHL season. † denotes player was on an NHL roster in 2014–15.

Farm teams

Quad City Flames
After two seasons in Omaha, Nebraska, and over $4 million in operating losses, the Calgary Flames chose to relocate their American Hockey League affiliate to the Quad Cities.  The new team, known as the Quad City Flames, will play in the West Division of the Western Conference.

Las Vegas Wranglers
Led by team scoring leader Chris Ferraro, the Las Vegas Wranglers reached the ECHL's Kelly Cup Finals in 2007–08 where they fell to the Cincinnati Cyclones four games to two.  Head Coach Glen Gulutzan expressed the team's disappointment in losing the championship. "It's an empty feeling, and I certainly don't like to talk about it, but the only way around it for me now is to try to move forward and start looking at next year," said Gulutzan.

The playoff disappointment represented a bitter end to a successful season, as the Wranglers finished first in the Pacific Division for the second consecutive season.  Their 47–13–5–7 record was the best in the National Conference, and their 106 points was good enough to finish third overall in the ECHL.

See also
 2007–08 NHL season

References

 Player stats: Calgary Flames player stats on espn.com
 Game log: Calgary Flames game log on espn.com
 Team standings: NHL standings on espn.com

Calgary Flames seasons
Calgary Flames season, 2007-08
Cal